The 7th New Brunswick Legislative Assembly represented New Brunswick between February 3, 1820, and March, 1820.

The assembly sat at the pleasure of the Governor of New Brunswick George Stracey Smyth.

The speaker of the house was selected as William Botsford.

History

Members 

Notes:

References 
Journal of the House of Assembly of the province of New-Brunswick from ... February to ... March, 1820 (1820)

07
1820 establishments in New Brunswick
1820 disestablishments in New Brunswick